Frank Smithies FRSE (1912–2002) was a British mathematician who worked on integral equations, functional analysis, and the history of mathematics. 
He was elected as a fellow of the Royal Society of Edinburgh in 1961.
He was an alumnus and an academic of Cambridge University.

Publications

References

External links
 
 
 

20th-century British mathematicians
Fellows of the Royal Society of Edinburgh
1912 births
2002 deaths
Mathematical analysts
Alumni of the University of Cambridge
Academics of the University of Cambridge
Scientists from Edinburgh
British historians of mathematics